My Aunt from Honfleur (French: Ma tante d'Honfleur) is a 1923 French silent comedy film directed by Robert Saidreau and starring Jane Loury, Armand Bernard and Marcel Vallée. It is based on the 1914 play My Aunt from Honfleur by Paul Gavault.

Cast
 Mary Belson as Yvonne
 Armand Bernard as Armand Berthier
 Pierre Etchepare as Adolphe Dorlage
 Jane Loury as Madame Raymond - la tante d'Honfleur
 Charles Martinelli as Monsieur Dorlange
 Louis Pré Fils as Le docteur Douce
 Marcel Vallée as Clément - le valet de chambre
 Peggy Vère as Albertine
 Irène Wells as Lucette
 Jean Joffre

References

Bibliography 
 Goble, Alan. The Complete Index to Literary Sources in Film. Walter de Gruyter, 1999.

External links 
 

1923 films
French comedy films
French silent films
1923 comedy films
1920s French-language films
Films directed by Robert Saidreau
French films based on plays
Silent comedy films
1920s French films